Innocent Chikunya (born 16 July 1985) is a Zimbabwean cricketer. He made his first-class debut for Midlands cricket team in the 2004–05 Logan Cup on 26 October 2004.

References

External links
 

1985 births
Living people
Zimbabwean cricketers
Centrals cricketers
Midlands cricketers
Mid West Rhinos cricketers
Cricketers from Mutare